Craig's Wife is a 1925 play written by American playwright George Kelly. It won the 1926 Pulitzer Prize for Drama, and has been adapted for three feature films.

Production

Craig's Wife premiered on Broadway at the Morosco Theatre on October 12, 1925, and closed on August 21, 1926, after 360 performances. Directed by playwright Kelly, the cast featured Chrystal Herne as Harriet Craig, Anne Sutherland (Miss Austen), Charles Trowbridge (Walter Craig), and Josephine Hull (Mrs. Frazie). 

It was included in Burns Mantle's The Best Plays of 1925–1926.

The play received the 1926 Pulitzer Prize for Drama. The Pulitzer committee wrote, "Craig's Wife has been selected by the jury on account of the dignity of its theme, the soundness of its construction, the excellence of its dialogue, and its effectiveness in the theater."

Film adaptations
There have been at least three films based on the play. The 1928 silent version was directed by William C. deMille, Cecil's brother, and starred Irene Rich in the title role. In 1936, Columbia Pictures made a film adaptation with Rosalind Russell as Harriet Craig. The 1950 film Harriet Craig, featuring Joan Crawford, was also based on the play.

Radio adaptations

Cecil B. deMille produced Craig's Wife on the Lux Radio Theatre in Hollywood in 1936. It featured Rosalind Russell and Herbert Marshall. Orson Welles's The Campbell Playhouse performed the play on CBS Radio, airing March 10, 1940. This version featured Welles as Walter Craig, and Ann Harding as Harriet Craig.

References

External links

 Full text of Craig's Wife at HathiTrust Digital Library
 
"Craig's Wife" (1936) on Lux Radio Theatre, with Rosalind Russell and Herbert Marshall (youtube.com)
 "Craig's Wife" (March 10, 1940) on The Campbell Playhouse, with Orson Welles and Ann Harding  (Internet Archive)
1952 Best Plays radio adaptation at Internet Archive

1925 plays
Broadway plays
Pulitzer Prize for Drama-winning works
American plays adapted into films